South Lenoir High School is located in Deep Run, North Carolina, USA. It is part of the Lenoir County Public School system. Its principal is Elizabeth P. Pierce.

History 
In 1926, the Deep Run School was built for grades 1–12. The spirit colors were red and white. The mascot was the state bird, the Cardinal. In 1964, the county's schools consolidated and Deep Run closed and was reopened at South Lenoir for high school students in Lenoir County south of the Neuse River. The new school's nickname was the "Rebels" before changing to the "Blue Devils" after the integration of white and black students in 1970. In November 2014, California sibling band Echosmith performed at South Lenoir, and sang songs such as "Cool Kids."

References

External links

 The History of South Lenoir, Kinston Free Press
 Public School Review : South Lenoir High School

Public high schools in North Carolina
Schools in Lenoir County, North Carolina